Mong Tseng Wai is a walled village in Ha Tsuen, Yuen Long District, New Territories, Hong Kong.

Administration
Mong Tseng Wai is a recognized village under the New Territories Small House Policy. For electoral purposes, Mong Tseng Wai is part of the Ping Shan North constituency.

History
In 2001, a house structure with underground water system dated to Song Dynasty were discovered in Mong Tseng Wai by the Hong Kong Archaeological Society. It was the only Song Dynasty village site in Hong Kong.

Mong Tseng Wai was founded by the Tang Clan of Kam Tin during the Ming dynasty. Mong Tseng Wai was historically probably allied to Ha Tsuen in an oath-sworn alliance, although it was not part of the Ha Tsuen Heung.

Features
 The entrance gate of the walled village was listed as a Grade III historic building.
 The nearby Yuen Kwan Tai Temple was listed as a Grade I historic building.

See also
 Walled villages of Hong Kong
 Mong Tseng Tsuen

References

External links

 Delineation of area of existing village Mong Tseng Wai (Ping Shan) for election of resident representative (2019 to 2022)
 Antiquities Advisory Board. Historic Building Appraisal. Yuen Kwan Tai Temple, Mong Tseng Wai Pictures
 Antiquities Advisory Board. Historic Building Appraisal. Pictures of Entrance Gate, Mong Tseng Wai
 Antiquities Advisory Board. Historic Building Appraisal. King Yip Study Hall, No. 113 Mong Tseng Wai Pictures

Walled villages of Hong Kong
Ha Tsuen
Villages in Yuen Long District, Hong Kong